ipcrm is a Unix and Linux command which will mark System V interprocess communication API kernel entities for removal. Actual removal is deferred until the last connected process has detached.
System V IPC kernel entities are:

Shared memory (interprocess communication) segments
Message queues
Semaphore arrays

Implementations
On Linux, the  command is provided by the util-linux package.

The  command has also been ported to the IBM i operating system.

See also
List of Unix commands
ipcs – provide information on ipc facilities

References

External links
ipcrm - ipcrm man page

Unix SUS2008 utilities
IBM i Qshell commands